Natalia Piekarczyk (born ) is a Polish volleyball player. She is part of the Poland women's national volleyball team. On club level she played for MKS Muszyna in 2015.

References

1988 births
Living people
Polish women's volleyball players
Place of birth missing (living people)